Eitzen Chemical is an international shipping company that owns 72, commercial manages additional 12 and has 31 newbuilding chemical tankers. It is the third largest chemical tanker operator by number of vessels in the world.

Shipping companies of Norway
Chemical shipping companies
Transport companies established in 2006
Eitzen Group
Companies formerly listed on the Oslo Stock Exchange
Companies based in Oslo
Norwegian companies established in 2006